George Monger  (3 March 1840 – 9 August 1887) was an English recipient of the Victoria Cross, the highest and most prestigious award for gallantry in the face of the enemy that can be awarded to British and Commonwealth forces.

Details
Monger was 17 years old, and a private in the 23rd Regiment of Foot (later The Royal Welch Fusiliers), British Army during the Indian Mutiny when the following deed took place on 18 November 1857 at Secundra Bagh, Lucknow, India for which he was awarded the VC:
Private Monger volunteered to accompany an officer, Thomas Bernard Hackett, whom he assisted in rescuing a corporal of the 23rd Regiment of Foot, who was lying wounded and exposed to very heavy fire. His citation reads:

Further information
He died in 1887 at the age of 47 from tuberculosis. He is buried at Hastings Cemetery, East Sussex, in section H, grave E-18 common. The headstone was erected by local residents. A blue plaque is displayed on his former house in Tower Road, St Leonards-on-Sea, East Sussex. His Victoria Cross is displayed at the Royal Welch Fusiliers Museum at Caernarfon Castle, Gwynedd, Wales.

References

Location of grave and VC medal (East Sussex)

1840 births
1887 deaths
People from the City of Winchester
British recipients of the Victoria Cross
Royal Welch Fusiliers soldiers
Indian Rebellion of 1857 recipients of the Victoria Cross
19th-century deaths from tuberculosis
British Army recipients of the Victoria Cross
Burials at Hastings Cemetery
Tuberculosis deaths in England
Military personnel from Winchester